Live Like We're Alive is the debut studio album from Christian rock band Nevertheless. It was released on September 19, 2006. Two singles were released off the album: "The Real" and "Live Like We're Alive".

Track listing

Personnel
James Paul Wisner – production, engineering, editing, additional guitars and keyboard
J.R. McNeely – mixing
Blaine Barcus – A&R
Josh Heiner – additional A&R
Dan Shike – mastering
Steve Johnson – assistant engineering
Chris Harry – drum tech
Alan Elkins – Viola on "O' Child"
Heather Hetzler – A&R production

References

2006 albums
Nevertheless (band) albums
Albums produced by James Paul Wisner